Taiwan Youth Day (TYD) is a youth-oriented Catholic Church event in Taiwan, organized by Youth Desk of Chinese Regional Bishops' Conference (CRBC). Seven dioceses in Taiwan take turn to plan and execute TYD. In 2004, the first ever TYD was created and it was decided to hold it every three years. However, in 2008, they have decided to have the TYD once a year.

Purpose 
During the meeting week, young adults enrich their spirituality through prayer, personal development, and faith sharing. At the same time, the organization hopes to encourage more youths to discover and renew their faith and to proclaim the word of the lord with justice and peace.

Origin 
In 2004, several young adults returned from the World Youth Day, gathered, and decided to create a similar experience where young Taiwanese Catholics can come together and support each other in group gatherings. Since then, they have also begun to encourage other youth desks to work together and build a network with each other. Ever since the first TYD, youth leaders from each Taiwanese archdiocese have gathered and worked towards creating an Asian Youth Day or an International experience where the Catholics from all over can come together and share their culture, language, and ethnicity.

Chronology of celebrations

See also 
 Roman Catholicism in Taiwan
 Chinese Catholic Bishops Conference
 World Youth Day
 Asian Youth Day

References

External links 
 Taiwan Catholic Youth Day Homepage (including World Youth Day, Asian Youth Day and Taiwan Youth Day)
 TYD Official Blog
 TYD on Facebook
 TYD 2008 Official Webpage
 TYD 2009 Official blog
 TYD 2011 Official blog
 Chinese Regional Bishops' Conference Official Site

Catholic Church in Taiwan
Festivals in Taiwan
Recurring events established in 2004
2004 establishments in Taiwan
Youth events
Youth in Taiwan
Annual events in Taiwan